Papon may refer to:
 Christiane Papon (1924–2023), French politician
 Jean-Pierre Papon (1734–1803), French abbot and historian
 Loÿs Papon (1533–1599), French playwright
 Maurice Papon (1910–2007), French politician
 Monique Papon (1934–2018), French politician
 Nazmul Hassan Papon (born 1961), Bangladeshi politician
 Papon (singer) (born 1975), Indian singer from Assam